George W. Gastlin born George Washington Gastlin (October 1, 1835 – October 2, 1895) was an American law enforcement officer and police captain, with the New York City Police Department, who founded the "Steamboat Squad" and served as its commander, during the 1870s and 80s.

Early life
Gastlin joined the 82nd New York Infantry Regiment as a corporal on May 21, 1861. He was promoted to sergeant before being discharged for disability on May 20, 1862.

Police career
He joined the NYPD on May 19, 1864, less than a year after the New York Draft Riots, and gradually rose up the ranks over the next few years being promoted to roundsman on February 15, 1868, and then sergeant on July 6, 1870. On June 9, 1876, Gastlin was appointed as head of the "Steamboat Squad", a special police unit formed to combat River pirates and street gangs active on the New York waterfront, and was finally made a captain on September 20, 1878.

On December 31, 1883, a meeting was held at the Astor House in honor of Gastlin and his work with the "Steamboat Squad". Organized by a 4-man committee under James Robbins (Stonington Line), J.S. Boden (Pennsylvania Railroad), C.H. Tucker (West Shore and Buffalo Railroad) and John S. Krems (Baltimore Transportation Company), at least 40 representatives from steamboat and railroad companies were in attendance including R.J. Cortes (White Star Line), W.H. Stamford (Old Dominion Line), E.A. Dereau (Stonington Line), John T. Robb (Pennsylvania Railroad), Andrew M. Underhill (Guion Line), James A. Smith (Citizens' Steamboat Company) and H.L. Freeland (Fall River Line). After giving a testimonial of the police captain's career, Andrew Underhill presented Gastlin with a custom-made gold shield on behalf of the committee along with a letter of thanks, placed in an elaborate gold frame, from all the companies involved.

Under his leadership, the "Steamboat Squad" drove out most of the criminal element from Corlears' Hook by the time of his retirement on July 1, 1890. He worked as a private detective for the next several years until poor health forced him to stop.

Death
Gastlin died from Bright's disease at his Seventh Avenue home on the morning of October 2, 1895, after a two-week illness.

References

Further reading
Costello, Augustine E. Our Police Protectors: History of the New York Police from the Earliest Period to the Present Time. New York: A.E. Costello, 1885. 
Walling, George W. Recollections of a New York Chief of Police: An Official Record of Thirty-eight Years as Patrolman, Detective, Captain, Inspector and Chief of the New York Police. New York: Caxton Book Concern, 1887.

1835 births
1895 deaths
New York City Police Department officers
People from Manhattan